The Bells at Temple Square (formerly known as the Bells on Temple Square) is a handbell choir that is an official music organization of the Church of Jesus Christ of Latter-day Saints (LDS Church). It was formed in 2005 under the direction of the Mormon Tabernacle Choir (Choir). The group is a double handbell choir, performing with 27 to 35 ringers on two sets of Malmark handbells (one seven-octave set and one 6½ octave set) and two sets of Malmark handchimes (six octaves each). The 12 octave two bells are Malmark aluminums. Each part is usually doubled (played by two ringers on separate sets), except octave two.

The Bells at Temple Square frequently accompanies the Choir in concerts and on the weekly Music and the Spoken Word radio and television broadcast.  Additionally, the group performs its own semi-annual concerts, typically in November and June.

The 2006 Christmas concert of the Bells on Temple Square, held in the LDS Conference Center in Salt Lake City, Utah, attracted an audience of over 15,000 people, and is believed to be one of the largest crowds ever to attend a handbell performance.

The Bells on Temple Square was selected to perform the closing concert at the 2017 National Seminar for the Handbell Musicians of America, held in Anaheim, CA.

On May 8, 2020, it was announced that the Bells on Temple Square would now be known as the Bells at Temple Square, in accordance with the Choir's new visual identity.

Thomas M. Waldron served as the group's first conductor from 2005 thru 2011. LeAnna Willmore succeeded him in 2011 and is the current conductor.

See also

Notes

External links 
The Tabernacle Choir at Temple Square - Bells on Temple Square
Bells Choir’s Testimonies Ring Clear
Mormon Channel: Everything Creative, Discussion 34 - Bells on Temple Square

Tabernacle Choir
Temple Square
Musical groups from Salt Lake City
American choirs
Latter Day Saint musical groups
Musical groups established in 2005
Handbell ringers
American Christian musical groups
2005 establishments in Utah